Mandarabad or Mender Abad (also Romanized as Mandarābād; formerly, Mohammadabad, also Romanized as Moḩammadābād) is a village in Shal District, Buin Zahra County, Qazvin Province, Iran. At the 2006 census its population was 485, in 121 families.

References 

Buin Zahra County
Populated places in Qazvin Province